Stephen W McQ Anderson (born 13 November 1946) was a Scottish footballer who played for Dumbarton, Alloa Athletic and East Fife. He also had spells with several junior clubs, including Dunipace, Bo'ness and Kirkintilloch Rob Roy

References

1946 births
Scottish footballers
Dumbarton F.C. players
East Fife F.C. players
Alloa Athletic F.C. players
Scottish Football League players
Living people
Association football goalkeepers